Tayloria amaniensis is a species of air-breathing land snail, a terrestrial pulmonate gastropod mollusk in the family Streptaxidae. This species is endemic to Tanzania.

References

Endemic fauna of Tanzania
Streptaxidae
Taxonomy articles created by Polbot